The 27th National Film Awards, presented by Ministry of Information, Bangladesh to felicitate the best of Bangladeshi Cinema released in the year 2002. Bangladesh National Film Awards is a film award ceremony in Bangladesh established in 1975 by Government of Bangladesh.  Every year, a national panel appointed by the government selects the winning entry, and the award ceremony is held in Dhaka. An eleven-member jury board chaired by the additional secretary of the Ministry of Information selected the winners in different categories. A 12-member jury board headed by Sadeq Khan, Chairman of Board of Directors, Press Institute of Bangladesh suggested the name of 17 artistes for the National Film Award in recognition of their outstanding contributions to the country's film industry.

List of winners
A Total of 17 awards were given in this year.

Merit Awards

Technical Awards

Special Award
 Best Child Artist (Special) - Nurul Islam Bablu (Matir Moyna)

See also
Bachsas Awards
Meril Prothom Alo Awards
Ifad Film Club Award
Babisas Award

References

External links

National Film Awards (Bangladesh) ceremonies
2002 film awards
2004 awards in Bangladesh
2004 in Dhaka